Mount Clough is an ice-free mountain,  high, standing  east of Mount Dort, at the south side of Cappellari Glacier, in the Queen Maud Mountains. It was discovered and first mapped by the Byrd Antarctic Expedition, 1928–30, and named by the Advisory Committee on Antarctic Names for John W. Clough, geophysicist who participated in the South Pole—Queen Maud Land Traverse II, summer 1965–66.

References 

Mountains of the Ross Dependency
Amundsen Coast